The men's 60 kg weightlifting competitions at the 1968 Summer Olympics in Mexico City took place on 14 October at the Teatro de los Insurgentes. It was the eleventh appearance of the featherweight class.

Results

References

Weightlifting at the 1968 Summer Olympics